Etz Hayim, also transliterated as Eitz Chaim (meaning "Tree of Life"), is a common term used in Judaism. It is also found in the Book of Proverbs, where it is figuratively applied to "the Torah" , "the fruit of a righteous man" , "a desire fulfilled" , and "healing tongue" .

Usage in Hebrew

 Etz Chaim is a common name for yeshivas and synagogues as well as for works of rabbinic literature.
 The term Etz Chaim is also used to describe each of the wooden poles to which the parchment of a Sefer Torah is attached. A hymn including the aforementioned verse  is sung in all Ashkenazi rites as the Torah is returned to the ark.

 In Kabbalah, the Etz Ḥayim symbol (The Tree of Life") is a mystical symbol used to understand the nature of God and the manner in which He created the world. The term Etz Ḥayim is also the title of one of the most important works in Jewish mysticism, written by Ḥayim Vital in the course of twenty years following the death of his master, Isaac Luria, in 1572, presenting and explicating Luria's systematic reconceptualization and expansion of the insights of the Zohar and other earlier mystical sources.  Vital's Etz Chaim is the foundational work for the later Lurianic Kabbalah, which soon became the mainstream form of Kabbalah amongst both Sephardi and Ashkenazi Jewry up to the modern period.  This massive multi-volumed work circulated only in manuscript form amongst mystics for over 100 years, and was first published in 1782.

Educational institutions

Etz Chaim Yeshiva, Jerusalem
Congregation Etz Chaim (Lombard, Illinois)
Their website can be found here.
Congregation Etz Chayim (Palo Alto, California)
Their website can be found here.
Congregation Etz Chayim (Toledo, Ohio)
Their website can be found here.
Congregation Etz Chaim of Ramona (Ramona, California)
Their website can be found here and
Their Facebook page can be found here.
Eitz Chaim Schools (Toronto, Ontario)
Their website can be found here.

English publications
 First volume of Hayim Vital's Kabbalistic text Etz Hayim has been translated in The Tree of Life: Chayyim Vital's Introduction to the Kabbalah of Isaac Luria – The Palace of Adam Kadmon, Donald Wilder Menzi and Zwe Padeh, Jason Aronson 1999. Introduction gives overview of Lurianic system
 Etz Hayim Humash: a Hebrew-English Torah commentary with haftarot, created by the Conservative movement of Judaism, with commentary by Chaim Potok.

See also
 Tree of life (disambiguation)
 Pittsburgh synagogue shooting

References

External links
Five tunes to the hymn sung as the Torah is returned to the ark

Hebrew words and phrases
Jewish symbols

he:עץ החיים (פירושונים)
lt:Etz Chaim